William John Skinner (born 8 February 1984 in Northampton) is an English former rugby union player who played openside flanker for Leicester Tigers and Harlequins.

He began his rugby career at Bedford School before representing England at U-18 and U-21 level. He came through the Leicester Tigers youth setup where many drew comparison between the small (5 ft 11 in (1.80 m), 14 st 3 lb (90.3 kg)), blond, pacy openside and his mentor, Tigers legend Neil Back.  Long term injury and lack of versatility however saw him leave Tigers in the summer of 2006 to move to Quins where he linked up with former Tigers' Director of Rugby and back row legend Dean Richards.

Skinner represented the England Sevens team at Brisbane in early 2003. Skinner represented England Saxons at the 2007 Churchill Cup.

Skinner was called into the England Saxons side that defeated Ireland A on 1 February 2008.

He captained the England Saxons to victory at the 2008 Churchill Cup.

Skinner was the youngest captain in the Guinness Premiership during the 2008–09 season. Will was also the youngest player ever to achieve the 200 appearance mark for Quins and could have gone on to achieve 300 had injury not struck

Injury forced his retirement in 2013.

Today Will enjoys the simple life in Singapore where he lists painting, playing the flute and numerous charity initiatives as his chief interests.

References

External links
England profile
Harlequins profile
Leicester profile

1984 births
Living people
English rugby union players
Leicester Tigers players
Harlequin F.C. players
Rugby union flankers
People educated at Bedford School
Rugby union players from Northampton